Sibylle Aimée Marie-Antoinette Gabrielle de Riquetti de Mirabeau, Comtesse de Martel de Janville (16 August 1849 – 28 June 1932) was a French writer who wrote under the pseudonym Gyp.

Life
She was born at the château de Coëtsal near Plumergat, in the département of the Morbihan, in Brittany, her father, Joseph-Arundel de Riquetti, comte de Mirabeau, 1820–1860, being the great-grandson of Victor de Riquetti, marquis de Mirabeau (Mirabeau Père), noted 18th-century economist, and grandnephew of Honoré Mirabeau the celebrated revolutionary orator. In view of her later opinions, it is interesting to remember that Sibylle was actually descended from Octave Mirabeau's royalist younger brother, André-Boniface-Louis de Riquetti, vicomte de Mirabeau, (1754–1792) known as Mirabeau-Tonneau because of his notorious embonpoint, who famously broke his sword in front of France's Revolutionary Assembly (where he represented the nobility of the Limousin) while bitterly crying out: "now that The King is giving up his kingdom, a nobleman no longer needs a sword to fight for him!"

Although, in her memoirs, "Gyp" stated that she had been born on August 15, which happens to have been Napoleon Bonaparte's birthday, her birth certificate reads "morning of August 16, 1849", according to her biographer, W. Z. Silvermann. At her father's request, the name on her birth certificate was revised to read "Sibylle Aimée Marie Antoinette Gabrielle".

Sibylle's mother, the comtesse de Mirabeau, née de Gonneville (1827–1903) was also a writer, who contributed to Le Figaro. In 1869, Sibylle married count Roger de Martel de Janville, by whom she had three children.

Gyp wrote humorous sketches and novels which brazenly denounced her own fashionable society as well as the French republic's political class. She hated republicanism, populist democracy, and party shenanigans; supported Boulanger; and was a fanatical anti-Semite & anti-Dreyfusard; in fact, while testifying at a court case in 1899 she gave her profession as "anti-Semite" rather than "writer". She began with some articles in La Vie parisienne in February 1877, then in La Revue des Deux Mondes. Starting in 1880, she began to publish in book form, under the pseudonym of Gyp, a total of more than 120 works, many highly successful: Petit Bob, (1882), Les Chasseurs,  Un trio turbulent,  Autour du mariage (1883), Ce que femme veut (1883), Sans voiles (1885), Autour du divorce (1886), Dans le train (1886), Mademoiselle Loulou (1888), Bob au salon (1889), L'éducation d'un prince (1890), Passionette (1891), Oh! la grande vie (1891), Une Election à Tigre-sur-mer (1890), based on Gyp's experience supporting a boulangiste candidate, Marriage civil (1892), Ces bons docteurs (1892) De haut en bas (1893), Le Mariage de Chiffon (1894), Leurs âmes (1895), Le Cœur d'Ariane (1895), Le Bonheur de Ginette (1896), Totote (1897), Lune de miel (1898), Israel (1898), L'Entrevue (1899), Le Pays des champs (1900), Trop de chic (1900), Le Friquet (1901), La Fée (1902), Un Mariage chic (1903), Un Ménage dernier cri (1903), Maman (1904), Le Cœur de Pierrette (1905), Les Flanchards (1917), Souvenirs d'une petite fille (1927–1928), etc.

Her best-known work is probably Le Mariage de Chiffon, filmed in 1942 by Claude Autant-Lara.

Because of her unpopular opinions, the comtesse was the victim of several attempts on her life as well as of a sensational kidnapping.

Gyp, self-styled "last of the Mirabeaus", died at Neuilly-sur-Seine on 28 June 1932.

Works

 La Vertu de la baronne, Calmann-Lévy, 1882
 Petit Bob, Calmann-Lévy, 1882
 Ce que femme veut, Calmann-Lévy, 1883
 Un homme délicat, Calmann-Lévy, 1884
 Le Monde à côté, Calmann-Lévy, 1884
 Plume et Poil, Calmann-Lévy, 1884
 Elle et lui, Calmann-Lévy, 1885
 Sans voiles !, Calmann-Lévy, 1885
 Le Druide, roman parisien, Victor-Havard, 1885
 Le Plus heureux de tous, 1885
 Autour du divorce, Calmann-Lévy, 1886
 Dans l'train, Victor-Havard, 1886
 Joies conjugales, Calmann-Lévy, 1887
 Pour ne pas l'être ?, Calmann-Lévy, 1887
 Les Chasseurs, Calmann-Lévy, 1887
 Mademoiselle Loulou, Calmann-Lévy, 1888
 Petit Bleu, Calmann-Lévy, 1888
 Bob au salon, Calmann-Lévy, 1888
 Pauvres petites femmes, Calmann-Lévy, 1888
 Les Séducteurs, Calmann-Lévy, 1888
 Bob à l'exposition, Calmann-Lévy, 1889
 Ohé, les psychologues!, Calmann-Lévy, 1889
 Mademoiselle Ève, Calmann-Lévy, 1889
 Une élection à Tigre-sur-Mer, racontée par Bob, 1890
 L'Éducation d'un prince, Calmann-Lévy, 1890
 Ô province !, Calmann-Lévy, 1890
 Ohé, la grande vie !, Calmann-Lévy, 1891
 Un raté, Calmann-Lévy, 1891 (également publié sous forme de roman-feuilleton dans Le Figaro du 8 janvier 1891 au 10 février 1891)
 Une passionnette, Calmann-Lévy, 1891
 Monsieur Fred, Calmann-Lévy, 1891
 Mariage civil, Calmann-Lévy, 1892
 Tante Joujou, Calmann-Lévy, 1892
 Monsieur le duc, Calmann-Lévy, 1892
 Madame la duchesse, Calmann-Lévy, 1893
 Pas jalouse, Calmann-Lévy, 1893
 Le Treizième, Calmann-Lévy, 1894
 Du haut en bas, Charpentier et Fasquelle, 1894
 Le Journal d'un philosophe, Charpentier et Fasquelle, 1894
 Le Mariage de Chiffon, Calmann-Lévy, 1894
 Professional Lover, Calmann-Lévy, 1894
 Le Cœur d'Ariane, Calmann-Lévy, 1895
 Ces bons Normands, Calmann-Lévy, 1895
 Leurs âmes, Calmann-Lévy, 1895
 Les Gens chics, Charpentier et Fasquelle, 1895
 Bijou, Calmann-Lévy, 1896
 Ohé, les dirigeants!, Léon Chailley, 1896
 Le Bonheur de Ginette, Calmann-Lévy, 1896
 Eux et elle, Calmann-Lévy, 1896
 Le Baron Sinaï, Charpentier et Fasquelle, 1897
 La Fée Surprise, Calmann-Lévy, 1897
 En balade: images coloriées du petit Bob, Mongredien, 1897
 Joie d'amour, Calmann-Lévy, 1897
 Totote : roman inédit, agrémenté de photos de Paul Sescau, Librairie Nilsson, 1897
 Ces bons docteurs ! , Calmann-Lévy, 1898
 Israël, Flammarion, 1898
 Miquette, Calmann-Lévy, 1898
 Journal d'un grinchu, Flammarion, 1898
 Sportmanomanie, Calmann-Lévy, 1898
 Lune de miel, Calmann-Lévy, 1898
 Les Femmes du colonel, Flammarion, 1899
 Les Izolâtres, Juven, 1899
 Les Cayenne de Rio, Flammarion, 1899
 L'Entrevue, Librairie Nilsson, 1899
 Monsieur de Folleuil, Calmann-Lévy, 1899
 Balancez vos dames, Librairie Nilsson, 1900
 Trop de chic !, Calmann-Lévy, 1900
 Journal d'une qui s'en fiche, Juven, 1900
 Martinette, Librairie Nilsson, 1900
 Jacquette et Zouzou, Flammarion, 1901
 Friquet, Flammarion, 1901
 Un mariage chic, Flammarion, 1902
 La Fée, Librairie Nilsson, 1902
 L'Âge du mufle, Juven, 1902
 Les Amoureux, Juven, 1902
 Les Chapons, Juven, 1902
 Sœurette, Juven, 1902
 Les Chéris, Juven, 1903
 Les Petits Amis, Juven, 1903
 Un ménage dernier cri, Flammarion, 1903
 Cloclo, Flammarion, 1904
 Pervenche, Juven, 1904
 Les Poires, Juven, 1904
 Les Froussards, Flammarion, 1904
 Maman, Librairie Nilsson, 1904
 Geneviève, Juven, 1905
 Le Cœur de Pierrette, Fayard, 1905
 Journal d'un casserolé, Juven, 1905
 Le Cricri, Juven, 1907
 L'Âge du toc, Flammarion, 1907
 La Bonne Galette, Fayard, 1907
 Doudou, Librairie Nilsson, 1907
 La Paix des champs, Juven, 1908
 La Bassinoire, Flammarion, 1908
 La Chasse de Blanche, nouvelles, Flammarion, 1909
 Entre la poire et le fromage, Juven, 1909
 L’Amoureux de Line, Flammarion, 1910
 Les Petits Joyeux, Calmann-Lévy, 1911
 Totote, Fayard, 1911
 L’Affaire Débrouillard-Delatamize, Calmann-Lévy, 1911
 La Bonne Fortune de Toto, Calmann-Lévy, 1911
 La Ginguette, Flammarion, 1911.
 La Meilleure Amie, Fayard, 1912
 Fraîcheur, Calmann-Lévy, 1912
 Napoléonette, Calmann-Lévy, 1913
 La Dame de Saint-Leu, Calmann-Lévy, 1914
 La Petite Pintade bleue, Calmann-Lévy, 1914
 Les Flanchards, 1917
 Les Profitards, Fayard, 1918
 L’Amour aux champs, 1920
 Souricette, Calmann-Lévy, 1922
 Le Coup du lapin, 1929
 Du temps des cheveux et des chevaux, Calmann-Lévy, 1929
 Celui qu'on aime, Flammarion, 1931
 Le Chambard, Le Livre moderne illustré, Ferenczi & fils, 1931
 Doudou, 2de édition 1931
 La Joyeuse Enfance de la IIIe République, Calmann-Lévy, 1931

Théâtre 
 Autour du mariage, Calmann-Lévy, 1883, comédie en cinq actes
 Tout-à-l'égout !, Calmann-Lévy, 1889, petite revue en trois actes et un prologue représentée à Paris au Helder, le 10 janvier 1889
 Sauvetage, pièce en un acte, Théâtre d'Application, 1890
 Mademoiselle Ève, 1895, adaptation pour le scène du roman éponyme
 Napoléonette, pièce en cinq actes et un prologue, d'après le roman éponyme, représentée au théâtre Sarah-Bernhardt, le 29 mai 1919, parue dans
 L'Illustration en 1921

References

Further reading
Silvermann, Willa Z. (1995) The Notorious Life of Gyp - Right-Wing Anarchist in Fin-de-Siècle France. Oxford University Press,

External links
 
 
 

1849 births
1932 deaths
19th-century French writers
19th-century French women writers
20th-century French writers
20th-century French women writers
French memoirists
French women novelists
Members of the Ligue de la patrie française
People from Morbihan
French women memoirists
19th-century memoirists